Calamagrostis canescens, known as purple small-reed, is a species of grass in the family Poaceae, native to Europe and western Siberia.

References

canescens
Flora of Europe
Flora of Siberia
Plants described in 1789